Dermaleipa metaxantha is a species of moth in the family Erebidae. The species is found in northern Australia.

External links
Australian Caterpillars

Ophiusini